Paul Gordon Clews  (born 19 July 1979 in Coventry, England) is a former motorcycle speedway rider from England.

Career
Clews has ridden for Great Britain at Under-21 level. He won the Premier League and KO Cup with the Reading Racers in 1998.

He started the 2008 season with the Newport Wasps in the Premier League. However, after the death of Newport promoter Tim Stone the club closed down which Clews became a free agent and so signed for the Berwick Bandits. He was the Berwick captain for the 2009 season. He retired from Speedway in 2011 after a final season with Berwick for the 2010 Premier League speedway season.

References 

1979 births
Living people
British speedway riders
English motorcycle racers
Sportspeople from Coventry
Coventry Bees riders
Reading Racers riders
Stoke Potters riders
Newcastle Diamonds riders
Oxford Cheetahs riders
Peterborough Panthers riders
Isle of Wight Islanders riders
Newport Wasps riders
Berwick Bandits riders